Church Hill is a census-designated place located in Armagh and Brown Townships in Mifflin County in the state of Pennsylvania, United States.  It is located north of the borough of Burnham.  As of the 2010 census, the population was 1,627 residents.

Demographics

References

Census-designated places in Mifflin County, Pennsylvania
Census-designated places in Pennsylvania